Martin Gold (born Nigel Wilson) is a British comedian and after-dinner speaker. He began his professional career as a comedy impressionist in the 1980s. In 2008 Martin took part in the annual pantomime, alongside Darren Day at the Forum Theatre, Billingham. The same year Martin was reviewed in The Stage, "an expert and completely in charge of his comedic situation." Gold also had a Sunday evening radio show on Mansfield 103.2 FM  between 2006–2009. Martin has appeared on numerous television programmes.

Early days
Martin started his career at the Leeds City Varieties Music Hall at the age of 11, when he was a finalist in the Yorkshire Evening Post talent competition.

Television appearances
The New Comedians, Granada TV
That's Entertainment (with Tom O'Connor)
It's Funny Up North, ITV Tyne Tees (with Vic Reeves and Lenny Henry)

Martin has also been a warm-up comedian for many shows, including This Is Your Life, Stars in Their Eyes, This Is My Moment, and Ready Steady Cook.

Celebrity status
Martin has guest starred on a number of UK tours for many stars, both British and American. These include Mickey Rooney, Al Martino and Gene Pitney. Martin was the supporting act on Gene's final tour in 2006, he had performed with Pitney at St David's Hall Cardiff, the night before his death.

References

External links

Profile at After Dinner Speakers and Comedians Ltd. Speaker Bureau

English male comedians
People from Wakefield
Living people
Year of birth missing (living people)